Tino Bonk (born 1 March 1967 in Dresden, Saxony) is an East German-German bobsledder who competed in the early 1990s. He won two medals in the four-man event at the FIBT World Championships with a silver in 1990 (for East Germany) a bronze  in 1991 (for Germany).

Bonk also finished sixth in the four-man event at the 1992 Winter Olympics in Albertville.

References
Bobsleigh four-man world championship medalists since 1930
Four-man bobsleigh Winter Olympic results: 1988-2002

1967 births
Bobsledders at the 1992 Winter Olympics
German male bobsledders
Living people
Olympic bobsledders of Germany
Sportspeople from Dresden